A variable cycle engine (VCE), also referred to as adaptive cycle engine (ACE), is an aircraft jet engine that is designed to operate efficiently under mixed flight conditions, such as subsonic, transonic and supersonic.

The next generation of supersonic transport (SST) may require some form of VCE. To keep aircraft drag at supercruise down, SST engines require a high specific thrust (net thrust/airflow) to keep the cross-sectional area of the powerplant to a minimum. This implies a high jet velocity not only at supersonic cruise, but at take-off, which makes the aircraft noisy.

A high specific thrust engine has a high jet velocity by definition, as the following approximate equation for net thrust implies:

where:
  intake mass flow rate
  fully expanded jet velocity (in the exhaust plume)
  aircraft flight velocity

Rearranging the above equation, specific thrust is given by:

 

So for zero flight velocity, specific thrust is directly proportional to jet velocity.

The Rolls-Royce/Snecma Olympus 593 in Concorde had a high specific thrust in supersonic cruise and at dry take-off power. This alone would have made the engines noisy, but the problem was compounded by the need for a modest amount of afterburning (reheat) at take-off (and transonic acceleration). An SST VCE would have to increase the engine airflow substantially at take-off, to reduce the jet velocity at a given thrust (i.e. a lower specific thrust)

Examples

One SST VCE concept is the tandem fan engine. The engine has two fans, both mounted on the low-pressure shaft, with a significant axial gap between the units. In normal flight, the engine is in the series mode, with the flow leaving the front fan passing directly into the second fan, the engine behaving much like a normal turbofan. However, for take-off, climb-out, final-descent and approach, the front fan is allowed to discharge directly through an auxiliary nozzle on the underside of the powerplant nacelle. Auxiliary intakes are opened on each side of the powerplant, allowing air to enter the rear fan and progress through the rest of the engine. Operating the fans in this parallel mode substantially increases the total airflow of the engine at a thrust, resulting in a lower jet velocity and a quieter engine. Back in the 1970s, Boeing modified a Pratt & Whitney JT8D to a tandem fan configuration and successfully demonstrated the switch from series to parallel operation (and vice versa) with the engine running, albeit at part power.
 
In the mid tandem fan concept, a high specific flow single stage fan is located between the high pressure (HP) and low pressure (LP) compressors of a turbojet core. Only bypass air is allowed to pass through the fan, the LP compressor exit flow passing through special passages within the fan disc, directly underneath the fan rotor blades. Some of the bypass air enters the engine via an auxiliary intake. During take-off and approach the engine behaves much like a normal civil turbofan, with an acceptable jet noise level (i.e., low specific thrust). However, for supersonic cruise, the fan variable inlet guide vanes and auxiliary intake close-off to minimize bypass flow and increase specific thrust. In this mode the engine acts more like a 'leaky' turbojet (e.g. the F404).

In the mixed-flow turbofan with ejector concept, a low bypass ratio engine is mounted in front of a long tube, called an ejector. This silencer device is deployed during take-off and approach. Turbofan exhaust gases induce additional air into the ejector via an auxiliary air intake, thereby reducing the specific thrust/mean jet velocity of the final exhaust. The mixed-flow design does not have the advantages of the mid-tandem fan design in terms of low-speed efficiency, but is considerably simpler.

In fighter aircraft engines, an emerging concept is the three-stream architecture, where a third bypass stream can be used to increase bypass ratio when fuel efficiency is required, or have additional airflow directed to the core for greater power. Under the Versatile Affordable Advanced Turbine Engines (VAATE) program, the U.S Air Force and industry partners developed this concept under the Adaptive Versatile Engine Technology (ADVENT) and the follow-on Adaptive Engine Technology Demonstrator (AETD) and Adaptive Engine Transition Program (AETP). Examples of three-stream engines include the General Electric XA100 and the Pratt & Whitney XA101, as well as the propulsion system for the Next Generation Air Dominance (NGAD) being developed under the Next Generation Adaptive Propulsion (NGAP) program.

Other applications

Another application that could benefit from the VCE approach is combat aircraft. Designers normally have to make a compromise on specific thrust of the engine. If they choose a high specific thrust, the reheat specific fuel consumption (SFC) will be very good, but the dry SFC poor. A high specific thrust implies a high fan pressure ratio, which indicates a high nozzle temperature in dry power. Consequently, the thrust boost in reheat is relatively low. By definition, both the dry and reheat thrust levels are good.

The opposite is true for a low specific thrust engine; i.e., poor reheat SFC, good dry and throttled SFC, good reheat thrust boost and, by definition, low dry and reheated thrust.

A high specific thrust engine would favour an aircraft requiring good duration in reheated combat, but it would be penalised on the range available in dry power.

On the other hand, a low specific thrust engine, would favour an aircraft with the need for long range in dry power, but compromise the time spent in reheated combat.

Thus engine designers often have to make a compromise on engine specific thrust.

However, the ideal combat VCE would have the high reheat thrust/good reheat SFC associated with a high specific thrust engine, but would have the low SFC of a low specific thrust engine in dry power and throttled back. Devising such an engine is difficult. General Electric developed a variable cycle Engine, known as the GE37 or General Electric YF120, for the YF-22/YF-23 fighter aircraft competition, in the late 1980s. GE used a double bypass/hybrid fan arrangement, but to date has never disclosed precisely how they exploited the concept. Although the YF120 was a good (possibly better) engine in the fly-off, the USAF erred on the side of caution and selected the more conventional Pratt & Whitney F119 as the powerplant for the production Lockheed Martin F-22 Raptor.

References

Mechanics
Jet engines